Men of Boys Town is a 1941 American drama film directed by Norman Taurog and written by James Kevin McGuinness. It is a sequel to the 1938 film Boys Town. The film stars Spencer Tracy, Mickey Rooney, Bobs Watson, Larry Nunn, Darryl Hickman and Henry O'Neill. The film was released on April 11, 1941, by Metro-Goldwyn-Mayer.

Plot
Mr. and Mrs. Maitland, a childless couple, invite Whitey to their home on a trial basis. Whitey tries to visit a friend in reform school and inmate Flip is hiding in a car as Whitey leaves. Flip steals money and both boys go to reform school. (This is where the movie takes a darker tone as it depicts, using indirect camera angles, the physical abuse the boys suffer in detention at the facility). Father Flanagan exposes the conditions in the school and the boys are released to him. The Maitlands work to pay off the debts threatening Boys Town.

Cast
Spencer Tracy as Father Flanagan 
Mickey Rooney as Whitey Marsh
Bobs Watson as Pee Wee
Larry Nunn as Ted Martley
Darryl Hickman as Flip
Henry O'Neill as Mr. Maitland
Mary Nash as Mrs. Maitland
Lee J. Cobb as Dave Morris
Sidney Miller as Mo Kahn
Addison Richards as The Judge
Lloyd Corrigan as Roger Gorton
George Lessey as Bradford Stone
Robert Emmett Keane as Burton
Arthur Hohl as Guard
Ben Welden as Superintendent 
Anne Revere as Mrs. Fenely
Wade Boteler as Police Lieutenant (uncredited) 
Frank Coghlan Jr. as Frank (uncredited)
Charles Smith as Slim

Reception
Critics singled out Darryl Hickman's performance, saying his juvenile delinquent character was "almost running away with Men of Boys Town right under Mickey Rooney's nose". The film was a hit and became the ninth most popular film at the United States box office in 1941. According to MGM records the film earned $2,009,000 in the US and Canada and $1,157,000 elsewhere resulting in a profit of $1,269,000.

References

External links
 

1941 films
1941 drama films
American black-and-white films
American drama films
American sequel films
1940s English-language films
Films about Catholic priests
Films directed by Norman Taurog
Films scored by Herbert Stothart
Films set in Nebraska
Films shot in Nebraska
Metro-Goldwyn-Mayer films
1940s American films
English-language drama films